The Last Witch Hunter is a 2015 American urban fantasy action film directed by Breck Eisner and written by Cory Goodman, Matt Sazama, and Burk Sharpless. The film stars Vin Diesel as an immortal witch hunter who must stop a plague from ravaging the entire world. The film was released on October 23, 2015, grossing $147 million while receiving generally unfavorable reviews from critics.

Plot
Eight hundred years ago, the Witch Queen unleashes the Black Plague to wipe out humanity. A band of knights, including a widowed Kaulder, storms her lair and defeats her. Before dying, the Witch Queen curses Kaulder with eternal life.

In the present day, Kaulder prevents a teenage witch from unintentionally destroying an airplane with weather-controlling runes. Kaulder is revealed to be working as a witch hunter for an organization called the Axe and Cross, which aims to keep the truce between humans and witches and either executes or imprisons the witches who break the law. He is aided by a priest called "Dolan", a tradition carried from the battle to destroy the Witch Queen.

The 36th Dolan tells Kaulder that he is retiring from his duties and has chosen a new Dolan for him, but dies in his sleep. Kaulder and the 37th Dolan deduce that 36 was murdered by a witch. While tracking down the witch, Kaulder finds traces of old dark magic, not seen since before he killed the Queen. It is revealed that 36 is not dead but under a dark magic spell that can only be broken if the witch that cast it is killed.

Using clues that 36 left behind, Kaulder goes to a witch bar, owned by Chloe and Miranda, to buy a memory spell to help him remember how he died and came back. Chloe eventually agrees to perform the spell. During the process of reliving Kaulder's memory, the bar is attacked by the witch who cursed the 36th Dolan. He later attacks Chloe at her apartment, though Kaulder saves her. 37 and Kaulder work together to determine the witch's name—Baltasar Ketola, aka Belial. After Miranda is killed by Belial, Chloe agrees to help Kaulder get what he needs to kill him.

To get the rare ingredient to create another memory spell, they visit another witch, Danique. However, Danique casts an endless memory spell on Kaulder, planning to entrap him in his dream forever. Chloe, revealed to be a dream-walker, is able to enter his trance and free his mind and the pair escape. Kaulder asks Chloe to enter his mind and pull out the memory. He discovers that, though the Queen's body burned to ash, the first Dolan chose to spare her heart; if the heart was destroyed, Kaulder would die. They deduce that 36 was attacked because he knew of where the heart was hidden and was tortured into revealing its location. They also realize that Belial's real plan is to revive the Queen.

Leaving Chloe and the 37th Dolan behind, Kaulder goes to face Belial to prevent the Queen from returning. Though he kills Belial in a confrontation, the Queen reenters the world through the sacrifice of another witch and escapes into the city, stealing Kaulder's immortality. 36, who is recovering, encourages Kaulder to continue fighting.

The members of the Witch Council, who guard the Witches' Prison, are killed and the Queen plans to release another plague curse using the imprisoned witches as a magical power source. Using her dream walking ability, Chloe kills one of the prisoners, severing the connection of the Queen. Kaulder fights the Queen, and appears close to killing her, until 37 attacks him with grudge for killing his witch parents. He asks the Queen to give him magical power. She refuses and kills 37 and uses Chloe to complete the connection for the plague curse to form again. Kaulder summons lightning to his sword using the weather runes he confiscated from the young witch on the plane, and throws his sword into the Queen, burning her to ash. Kaulder prepares to kill both himself and the Queen's heart, but Chloe dissuades him, stating that there were things in the darkness worse than the Witch Queen that he needs to continue fighting.

The 36th Dolan agrees to delay his retirement and stay by Kaulder's side. Chloe does as well, and the three form a new team, free from the Axe and Cross. The heartbeat of the Queen is heard within Kaulder's weapon stash in his apartment.

Cast

Production

Screenwriter Corey Goodman was largely influenced by talks with Vin Diesel, specifically about his Dungeons & Dragons witch hunter character. Initially Timur Bekmambetov was to direct but was later replaced by Breck Eisner and Goodman's script was re-written by D.W. Harper before Melisa Wallack was brought on to work on the film's script. Both were uncredited. The production filed for a film tax credit in Pennsylvania and was allocated a tax credit of $14 million. In February 2014, Vin Diesel posted a photo of the film's concept artwork to his Facebook page and Lionsgate CEO Jon Feitheimer commented that if successful, The Last Witch Hunter could become a film franchise. In March 2014, Lakeshore Entertainment boarded the film as co-financier with Lionsgate, but Lakeshore quietly left the project. In July 2014, it was announced that Rose Leslie would be joining the cast as Vin Diesel's co-star, and in August, Elijah Wood, Michael Caine, and Ólafur Darri Ólafsson were also announced as attached to the film. Julie Engelbrecht and Lotte Verbeek will also star. In February 2015, Steve Jablonsky was hired to compose the film's score.

Principal photography for The Last Witch Hunter was initially delayed due to the death of Paul Walker, as the death delayed shooting for Furious 7. Lionsgate officially began setting up for filming in Pittsburgh in June 2014. The filming began on September 5, 2014, in Pittsburgh, as Diesel posted a first look of himself on Facebook. The shoot lasted until December 5.

Music
R&B singer Ciara covered "Paint It Black" by English rock band the Rolling Stones for the film.
	
On 13 November 2015, The Last Witch Hunter Soundtrack, with music composed by Steve Jablonsky was released.

Release
The film's New York City premiere was held October 13, 2015 at the Loews Lincoln Square.

Reception

Box office
The Last Witch Hunter grossed $27.4 million in North America and $113 million in other territories for a worldwide total of $140.4 million, against a budget of $90 million.

The film opened on October 23, 2015 alongside Paranormal Activity: The Ghost Dimension, Rock the Kasbah and Jem and the Holograms, as well as the expanded release of Steve Jobs. In its opening weekend, the film was projected to gross $13 million from 3,082 theaters; it made $525,000 from its Thursday night previews and $3.7 million on its first day. In its opening weekend, the film grossed $10.8 million, finishing fourth at the box office behind The Martian ($15.7 million), Goosebumps ($15.3 million) and Bridge of Spies ($11.3 million).

Outside North America, the film's top openings were in Russia and the CIS ($3.4 million), Brazil ($2 million) and Italy ($1.2 million).

Critical response
On Rotten Tomatoes, the film has a rating of 17%, based on 123 reviews, with an average rating of 3.8/10. The site's critical consensus reads, "Grim, plodding, and an overall ill fit for Vin Diesel's particular charms, The Last Witch Hunter will bore and/or confuse all but the least demanding action-fantasy fans." On Metacritic, the film has a score of 34 out of 100, based on 22 critics, indicating "generally unfavorable reviews". Audiences polled by CinemaScore gave the film an average grade of "B−" on an A+ to F scale.

Alison Willmore from BuzzFeed News said "It is terrible. It is fabulously entertaining." Inkoo Kang of TheWrap thought it aimed for pulp but wasn't "as fleet, funny, or detailed as it needs to be". Simon Abrams for RogerEbert.com called it "atypically dopey but consummately well-assembled", and praised Diesel as "especially charming".

Future
On June 17, 2015, Diesel stated on his Facebook page that an untitled sequel was in the planning stages. Though it was initially planned to be a franchise, the poor box office showing as well as Diesel's busy film schedule has cast doubts on a sequel getting made.

On March 10, 2020, Diesel stated that Lionsgate is going through with a sequel.

References

External links

 
 
 
 

 
2015 films
2015 3D films
2015 action films
2015 fantasy films
2010s American films
2010s English-language films
2010s fantasy action films
American 3D films
American dark fantasy films
American fantasy action films
American supernatural films
Films about curses
Films about witchcraft
Films directed by Breck Eisner
Films produced by Gary Lucchesi
Films produced by Tom Rosenberg
Films scored by Steve Jablonsky
Films set in New York City
Films shot in Pittsburgh
Films with screenplays by Matt Sazama and Burk Sharpless
Lionsgate films
MoviePass Films films
Summit Entertainment films
Supernatural action films
Supernatural fantasy films
Witch hunting in fiction